Saint-Simon (Languedocien: Sant Simon) is a commune in the Lot department in south-western France.

See also
 Communes of the Lot department

References

Saintsimon